Andrew Parrott (born 10 March 1947) is a British conductor, perhaps best known for his pioneering "historically informed performances" of pre-classical music. He conducts a wide range of repertoire, including contemporary music. He conducted the premiere of Judith Weir's A Night at the Chinese Opera (as well as its first recording). He has also recorded new music by other modern British composers (including John Tavener), and by Vladimír Godár.

In 1973 he founded the Taverner Choir, Consort and Players, a "period instruments" ensemble based in London. Towards the end of 1973 he began conducting the early music group Musica Reservata, also based in London, after John Beckett left. He was music director of the London Mozart Players for several years until September 2006. From 2001 to 2010 Parrott was music director of the New York Collegium in New York City, New York.

Parrott has published several articles on Bach, Monteverdi and Purcell, is co-editor of the New Oxford Book of Carols and author of The Essential Bach Choir, which was informed by his work with Joshua Rifkin on one-voice-per-part performance of Bach's vocal works. This approach significantly reduces the forces employed in a performance of Bach's choral work, as it essentially removes the choir.

He is a Patron of Bampton Classical Opera.

Bibliography
 Parrott, A. (2000): The Essential Bach Choir. Woodbridge: Boydell Press.

References

External links 
 Bach-cantatas.com: Andrew Parrott
 Short biography at Sony Classical
 Biography at Rayfield Allied
 Short biography at New York Collegium
 Discography
 Interview with Andrew Parrott, 12 July 1990

English choral conductors
British male conductors (music)
1947 births
Living people
British performers of early music
20th-century British conductors (music)
20th-century English musicians
21st-century British conductors (music)
21st-century English musicians
20th-century British male musicians
20th-century British musicians
21st-century British male musicians
Erato Records artists